Abbasabad-e Faramishan (also Romanized as ‘Abbāsābād-e Farāmīshān; also known as ‘Abbāsābād-e Farāmūshān, ‘Abbāsābād-e ‘Amīdī, and Farāmīshān) is a village in Astaneh Rural District, in the Central District of Roshtkhar County, Razavi Khorasan Province, Iran. At the 2006 census, its population was 2,933, in 703 families.

See also 

 List of cities, towns and villages in Razavi Khorasan Province

References 

Populated places in Roshtkhar County